The British Rail Class 205 (3H) diesel-electric multiple units were built by BR at Eastleigh from 1957 to 1962, and in service for 47 years from BR Southern Region to Connex South Central and finally to the Southern franchise. They were eventually replaced by Class 171 Turbostar units.

Description
This class of unit was built in four different batches for use on different lines.

The Southern Region class 201 to 207 DEMUs are nicknamed 'Thumpers' owing to the noise they made while in motion.

The first batch of units, numbered 1101–1118, was built in 1957 as two-car units and classified as 2H. The first units entered service in September 1957. However, owing to increasing passenger numbers, all eighteen units were strengthened to three cars in 1958 and 1969, with the addition of a centre trailer, and therefore were reclassified as 3H units. Upon the introduction of TOPS they were reclassified as Class 205. Some of these were later converted back to 2 car sets, but they retained their Class 205 designation.

The second batch of 2H units, numbered 1119–1122, was built as 2-car units in 1958. These units remained as two-car sets until 1979, and were reclassified as Class 204 upon the introduction of TOPS. In May 1979, following the disbandment of the four Class 206 units, they were strengthened to three cars and redesignated as Class 205s.

The third batch of units was built as three-car sets in 1959, and numbered 1123–1126. These units were built to supplement the first batch on services in Hampshire. Collectively, the first and third batches are often called Hampshire sets. The final batch of units, numbered 1127–1133, was built in 1962 as three car sets. These units have some detail differences from the earlier batches, such as a different internal layout, and smaller route indicators (compare the two photos). The final batch of units is sometimes referred to as Berkshire sets.

Technical details
Power car (one per set)
 Introduced: 1957
 Weight: 
 Transmission: Electric, two English Electric type EE507 traction motors rated at  each.
 Maximum tractive effort: 
 Driving wheel diameter: 
 Coupling code: Standard "Buckeye" compatible with contemporary Class 20x and 4xx units.
 Train heating: Electric

Number 1129 was experimentally fitted with a Dorman 12QTCW V-12 diesel engine of

Operations
The first examples of the class entered service in September 1957 after a month of testing. They were initially used on services linking Portsmouth and Southampton to Salisbury, as well as those between Southampton and Portsmouth Harbour and from Southampton to Alton/Andover. Journey times were around two-thirds of those required by the steam locomotives which the units replaced. The new services proved so popular that the class was temporarily taken off the route to Alton and Andover to provide extra capacity on the other lines prior to the fitting of a third carriage to the first 18 units.

The delivery of the second batch of four units saw the class introduced to the Marshlink Line between Ashford and Hastings. All of these routes except for the Marshlink Line had been closed by 1967, by which time the route between Reading and Salisbury was also operated by the class.

 
Soon after introduction, an orange "V" shape was painted on the motor-coach in order to provide an early visual indication to station staff that there was no brake van at the other end of the unit. With the introduction of yellow warning panels the orange V was replaced by an inverted black triangle; this being extended at this time to all Southern Region 2 & 3-car multiple units.

Those which survived largely operated on services from Ashford to Hastings and from London to Uckfield. The privatisation of British Rail in 1995/6 saw the surviving Class 205s, most of which now carried Network SouthEast livery, pass to the new Connex South Central franchise.

In 1966, unit number 1102 was used in the film "The Great St. Trinian's Train Robbery".

When Govia won the South Central franchise in 2001, a franchise commitment was to replace all Mark 1 rolling stock by 2005, as it did not meet modern health and safety requirements. The final units, nos. 205001/009/033 were withdrawn in mid-December 2004.

Accidents and incidents

At 0827hrs on Saturday the 15 October 1994, the Cowden rail crash occurred, involving a head-on collision between two trains in heavy fog. The branch line is from Hurst Green junction near Oxted, south to Uckfield and at this point is single track. The northbound train failed to wait at the Ashurst loop and entered the single line section at Blackham junction against the red signal at OD58. Units involved were 205029 with 205032 and 205018 with 205001.

Fleet details

Unrefurbished Class 205/0

Refurbished Class 205/1

Refurbished Class 205/2

Departmental Units

Preservation
Due to a generous disposal policy by Porterbrook Leasing, nearly all of the final units in service were preserved. The only unit not preserved was no. 205012, which had poor bodywork and donated its engine to the only surviving unrefurbished Class 207 unit.
205001 - East Kent Railway (2-car unit)
205008 - (DTCsoL 60820) Preserved by the Hastings Diesels Group at St Leonards-on-Sea, on loan to the Lavender Line (Can operate with unit 205033)
205009 - Eden Valley Railway (3-car unit)
205018 - (DTCsoL 60828 from 205029) Lavender Line (2-car unit)
205023 - (DTCsoL 60822) and TSO 60669 (from 205024) at Swindon and Cricklade Railway. TSO 60669 will be stripped for spares to restore DTCsoL 60822 and then scrapped. DMBS 60122 at Lavender Line)
205025 - Mid-Hants Railway (2-car unit)
205027 - (DMBSO 60145) Stored at St Leonards Depot with DMBSO 60149 
205028 - Dartmoor Railway, later Caledonian Railway (Brechin) (3-car unit) 
205031 - (DMBSO 60149) Stored at St Leonards Depot with DMBSO 60145 
205032 - Dartmoor Railway, later Caledonian Railway (Brechin) (3-car unit)
205033 - (TSO 60678 at Cold Norton, DMBS 60151 and DTCsoL 60832 at Lavender Line)(60151 can operate with DTCsoL 60820)
205205 - Epping Ongar Railway (2-car unit)

Models 
An OO gauge kit is available from DC Kits. Dapol announced (May 2008) that a limited edition OO RTR model (to be followed by an N gauge version) of the Class 205 would be produced in collaboration with Kernow Model Rail Centre. Manufacture was switched to Bachmann in March 2010 and the model was released in February 2013.

References

Further reading

External links 

East Kent Railway — Home of 205001
Hampshire & Sussex Unit Preservation Society (HSUPS) — owners of preserved unit 205023.
Hastings Diesels — owners of preserved DTCsoL 60820 from unit 205008.
Eden Valley Railway — home of preserved unit 205009.
 Kernow Model Rail Centre
 DC Kits

205
Diesel electric multiple units
Train-related introductions in 1957